Plav was a medieval county (župa) at the location of the modern town of Plav, Montenegro, in the area around the Lake Plav, where there are still ruins of the old fortified city. Its oldest mentions are from 1282 to 1298 and in 1330, when it was part of the Kingdom of Serbia. For some time it was ruled by Serbian Queen Helen of Anjou ( 1245–1309).

References

Medieval Montenegro
Subdivisions of Serbia in the Middle Ages
Kingdom of Serbia (medieval)
Plav, Montenegro
Historical regions in Montenegro